The Ronald J. Norick Downtown Library is a library affiliated with the Metropolitan Library System in downtown Oklahoma City, in the U.S. state of Oklahoma. The four-story, 114,130 square-foot library, opened on August 17, 2004.

The building is named after former mayor Ron Norick, and cost approximately $21.5 million to construct. The nine-year effort to stop rainwater from leaking into the building was completed in 2009.

References

External links

 Ronald J. Norick Downtown Library at Emporis

2004 establishments in Oklahoma
Buildings and structures in Oklahoma City
Library buildings completed in 2004